Mickey Andrews (born May 20, 1942) is a former American football coach.  He is most known for his tenure as the defensive coordinator at Florida State for 26 seasons, from 1984 to 2009, under head coach Bobby Bowden. Andrews also served as the head football coach at Livingston University—now known as the University of West Alabama from 1970 to 1972 and at the University of North Alabama from 1973 to 1976.

College
At the University of Alabama, Andrews earned second-team All-America honors as a wide receiver and defensive back. Andrews was also on two Alabama national championship teams  (1961 and 1964) and played in three New Year's Day bowl games. 

In college baseball, Andrews was an All-SEC choice. In 1964, he received the Hugo Friedman Award as Alabama's best all-around athlete.

Career
Under Andrews, Florida State became the top producer of All-America and National Football League caliber cornerbacks in the nation. Andrews coached two Jim Thorpe Award winners and had an All-American cornerback for eight straight years, from 1987 to 1994. He had one consensus All-America selection in 2000. Seven of Andrews' defensive teams were among the top five nationally against the run since 1994. His 1998 defensive unit ranked No. 1 nationally in total defense and pass defense. On November 3, 2009, Andrews announced that he would retire as defensive coordinator after 26 seasons at Florida State.  Andrews retired, along with Bobby Bowden, at the end of the 2009 season and coached his final game in Florida State's victory over West Virginia on January 1, 2010, in the Gator Bowl.  He stayed on the university payroll until February 10, 2010, the anniversary date of his hiring by Bowden. On August 3, 2018 he was hired as special assistant to Willie Taggart, the head football coach at Florida State University.

Personal
Andrews was married to Diane, who died in 2012 of complications from stomach cancer.  The couple had two children: Ronald David (Ronnie), who died in 2007, father of three children, and Shannon Nicole (now Stallworth) who has two children.  Andrews still lives in Tallahassee.

Accolades
1971 NAIA National Championship at University of West Alabama
1994 University of West Alabama Hall of Fame
1996 Athlon Magazine's Assistant Coach of the Year
1996 Broyles Award as the nation's top assistant coach
1998 American Football Coach's Magazine's Defensive Coordinator of the Year

Head coaching record

College

References

1942 births
Living people
American football defensive backs
American football wide receivers
Alabama Crimson Tide baseball players
Alabama Crimson Tide football players
Clemson Tigers football coaches
Eastern Kentucky Colonels football coaches
Florida Gators football coaches
Florida State Seminoles football coaches
North Alabama Lions football coaches
West Alabama Tigers football coaches
High school football coaches in Alabama
People from Daleville, Alabama